The United States of America has charged Guantanamo captives before "Military Commissions", each presided over by a Presiding Officer.

The Presiding Officers were initially to serve as the first among equals on bodies were the commission members served the roles similar to both judge and jury.

In the first version of the Military Commissions the Presiding Officer was to be the only member of the Commission who was a lawyer. So the Presiding Officer would be making all the ruling similar to the rulings on points of law that a judge makes in courts of law. But the Presiding Officer would also be voting on the suspect's guilt or innocence—unlike in a jury trial.

The Commission system was extensively reformed in the summer of 2004. Several of the original Commission members of the first Commission were retired, because of their inherent bias. The structure of the Commissions were changed, so that the Presiding Officer would no long vote on the suspect's guilt. In the summer of 2005 leaked memos were published that revealed that prior to the reorganization the first Chief Prosecutor, Fred Borch, promised his subordinates that only officers who could be counted on to convict suspects would be chosen as Commission members, and that Prosecutors would not have to worry about exculpatory evidence—as it would all be classified so it could be withheld from the suspect's attorneys on National Security grounds.

Peter Brownback—the first Presiding Officer, was unexpectedly replaced in the summer of 2008.
Critics speculated that he had been fired because he kept trying to force Omar Khadr's prosecution to release evidence to Khadr's Defense attorneys.

List of Presiding Officers and suspects

References

Guantanamo Bay captives legal and administrative procedures